The Buddhist is the first Buddhist television channel for Sri Lanka. The Buddhist channel studios are located at Sri Sambodhi Vihara (Temple) that is situated in Colombo, Sri Lanka. It is available on the Sri Lankan Direct to Home satellite television services Dialog TV and Dish TV. The service also operates on PEO TV and cable TV. The aim of the channel is to telecast valuable religious and cultural programming in the three main languages of Sri Lanka, English, Sinhala and Tamil. The founder and the Chairman of the Buddhist TV is the most Ven. Daranagama Kusaladhamma Thero. On 29 June 2007, the channel was officially launched by President Mahinda Rajapaksa, Chief Justice Sarath N. Silva and head priest of the Asgiriya chapter in Sri Lanka.

Buddhist Radio
Buddhist Radio is broadcast on FM MHz 101.3 101.5.

Costs
Cost of channel establishment is 65 million Sri Lankan rupee (approx. US$600,000). The equipment and the channel was donated by the former Founder / CEO of CBN Sat (Dialog TV) Muhunthan Canagey.

See also
 Daranagama Kusaladhamma Thero
 Global Buddhist Network
 Shraddha TV
 Lord Buddha TV
 Buddhist Publication Society & Pariyatti (bookstore)
 Buddhist Cultural Centre
 Access to Insight

References

External links
 The Buddhist Official website

The Buddhist
The Buddhist
Religious television channels in Sri Lanka
Sinhala-language television stations
Television channels and stations established in 2007